The Chinese Taipei women's national under-18 ice hockey team is the women's national under-18 ice hockey team of Taiwan (Republic of China). The team is controlled by Chinese Taipei Ice Hockey Federation, a member of the International Ice Hockey Federation (IIHF). The team made its international debut in 2018 when they competed in, and won, the 2018 IIHF Women's Challenge Cup of Asia.

History
The Chinese Taipei women's national under-18 ice hockey team played its first game in March 2018 against the Thailand women's team during the 2018 IIHF Women's Challenge Cup of Asia being held in Kuala Lumpur, Malaysia. Chinese Taipei won the game 5–3 and went on to win their other two matches against the New Zealand women's under-18 team and Singapore's women's team with the 12–1 win against Singapore currently their largest win on record. Chinese Taipei won the tournament after finishing in first place following their three wins ahead of the second placed New Zealand. Wang Hsuan was named best forward by the IIHF Directorate and Tao Sing-Lin was selected as the best Chinese Taipei player of the tournament. In May 2018 the IIHF announced that Chinese Taipei would enter a team into the IIHF World Women's U18 Championships for 2019.

International competitions

 2018 IIHF Women's Challenge Cup of Asia Finish: 1st
 2019 IIHF World Women's U18 Championship Finish: 23rd place (3rd in Division II Group B)
 2020 IIHF World Women's U18 Championship Finish: 21st place (1st in Division II Group A)
 2022 IIHF World Women's U18 Championship Finish: 16th place (3rd in Division I Group B)

World Women's U18 Championship record

*Includes one losses in extra time (in the round robin)

Players and personnel

Current roster
For the 2018 IIHF Women's Challenge Cup of Asia

Current team staff
For the 2018 IIHF Women's Challenge Cup of Asia
Head coach: Yin An-Chung Yin
Assistant coach: Huang Jen-Hung
Team Leader: Huang Chueh-Yu
Team Medical Officer: Liao Wei-Chu

References

External links
Chinese Taipei Ice Hockey Federation

Ice hockey in Taiwan
Ice hockey
Women's national under-18 ice hockey teams